Orthotylus dimorphus is a species of bug in the Miridae family that can be found on Cyprus and Balearic Islands.

References

Insects described in 1958
dimorphus